Margo Geer (born March 17, 1992) is an American competition swimmer specializing in sprint freestyle. She is the current head coach of the University of Alabama’s men’s and women’s programs as of August 2021 following her bid for the Olympic Games.

Early life
She began swimming at the Springfield YMCA (SPY) in Springfield, Ohio under coaches Dave Johnson, Mickey McNeil and John Bishop at just four years old. She later swam for Fairbanks High School. She graduated the University of Arizona in 2014. Geer was a volunteer swim coach at Ohio State University during their 2016–17 season. She is an American competitive swimmer who specializes in freestyle events.

Career
Geer attended the University of Arizona, where she swam for the Arizona Wildcats swimming and diving team. She was a three-time NCAA National Champion (50-yard freestyle in 2013; 100-yard freestyle in 2013 and 2014). She was also named the 2015 Pac-12 Woman of the Year. She represented the United States at the 2015 World Aquatics Championships where she won a gold medal swimming for the first-place U.S. team in the preliminary heats of the 4×100-meter mixed freestyle relay, a silver medal in the 4 × 100 m mixed medley relay, and a bronze medal in the 4×100-meter freestyle relay. After her collegiate career, she competed at the 2008, 2012, and 2016 Olympic Trials, where she finished fifth in 2012.

References

External links
 
 
 Margo Geer at the 2019 Pan American Games

1992 births
Living people
American female freestyle swimmers
Arizona Wildcats women's swimmers
World Aquatics Championships medalists in swimming
Swimmers at the 2019 Pan American Games
Pan American Games medalists in swimming
Pan American Games gold medalists for the United States
Pan American Games silver medalists for the United States
Medalists at the 2019 Pan American Games